This is a list of mayors of Rotterdam.

References 

Rotterdam
 
Government of Rotterdam
History of Rotterdam